TSS St Patrick (III) was a passenger vessel operated by the Great Western Railway from 1947 to 1948 and British Railways from 1948 - 1972

History

She was built for the Great Western Railway in 1947 as one of a pair of new vessels for the Fishguard to Rosslare service, the other being TSS St David. She replaced a former ship of the same name which had been sunk by torpedo on 13 June 1941. British Railways took ownership in 1948 and she was based in Weymouth. Typically running services to Cherbourg, she was also used in the summer for trips from Torquay to the Channel Islands. In 1963 she was transferred to Southampton for services to St Malo and Le Havre, and in 1965 she moved to Folkestone for the service to Boulogne.

She was sold in 1972 to Gerasimos S. Fetouris, in Piraeus, and renamed Thermopylae. She was sold again in 1973 to Agapitos Bros, Piraeus and renamed Agapitos I. Scrapped in 1980 in Greece.

References

1947 ships
Passenger ships of the United Kingdom
Steamships of the United Kingdom
Ships built on the River Mersey
Ships of the Great Western Railway
Ships of British Rail